Phoenix F.C. is a football club from Fingal in Dublin, Ireland. The club competes in the Athletic Union League (association football). Phoenix plays at a football complex in Scribblestown. Former players at the club have included ex-Bohemian F.C. player Marc Hughes, ex-Shamrock Rovers player Marc Kenny, and Ciarán O'Donoghue.

History
The club was formed on 1 June 2006 by the amalgamation of Ashtown Villa and Kinvara Ards. For their part, Kinvara Ards, who were established in 1982, had previously merged with Kinvara Boys.

The committee of Ashtown Villa FC had a vision to bring in schoolboy football to the community based on one club operating in Scribblestown at the all-weather facilities which is complemented with two grass pitches and a modern club house.

Honours
Ashtown Villa
FAI Intermediate Cup
Winners: 2001–02: 1

Kinvara Boys
FAI Junior Cup
Winners: 1992–93: 1

References

Association football clubs established in 2006
Leinster Senior League (association football) clubs
Association football clubs in Fingal
2006 establishments in Ireland